La Costera is a comarca in the province of Valencia, Valencian Community, Spain.

Municipalities 

L'Alcúdia de Crespins
Barxeta
Canals
Cerdà
Estubeny
La Font de la Figuera
Genovés
La Granja de la Costera
Llanera de Ranes
Llocnou d'En Fenollet
La Llosa de Ranes
Moixent/Mogente
Montesa
Novetlè/Novelé
Rotglà i Corberà
Torrella
Vallada
Vallès
Xàtiva

 
Comarques of the Valencian Community
Geography of the Province of Valencia